Moçâmedes is a city in southwestern Angola, capital of Namibe Province. The city's current population is 255,000 (2014 census). Founded in 1840 by the Portuguese colonial administration, the city was named Namibe between 1985 and 2016. Moçâmedes has a cool dry climate and desert vegetation, because it is near the Namib Desert.

History 

The area was first explored by the Portuguese in 1785 and claimed for Portugal by Luís Cândido Cordeiro Pinheiro Furtado, who had been sent there in the frigate Loanda by the then governor-general of Angola, Baron Moçâmedes (Portuguese: Barão de Mossâmedes), who also sent an overland expedition headed by Gregório José Mendes to rendezvous with Furtado. They renamed the bay Moçâmedes in honour of the baron. 

In 1839 the then governor-general of Angola, Admiral Noronha, sent a fresh expedition to subdue the local chiefs and make them vassals of Portugal. 

Moçâmedes was officially founded in 1840 by the Portuguese colonial administration on a bay that the Portuguese originally called Angra do Negro by order of Portuguese prime minister, the Count of Bonfim, who was also head of the Colonial Department. 

In 1840 a factory was established and in July of the same year a fort was built at Ponta Negra. The area was colonized mainly by Portuguese settlers from Madeira and Brazil; in the 1850s the Portuguese government also gave sea passage and financial assistance to a large number of German colonists. 

The village grew as a fishing port and by the 1960s it had 143 fishing boats and several fish processing factories. The port soon ranked alongside other important fishing ports such as Luanda, Benguela and Lobito. 

About 200 km from the city of Namibe the Portuguese authorities founded the Iona National Park, Angola's oldest and largest national park, proclaimed as a reserve in 1937 and upgraded to a national park covering 15,150 km² in 1964.

Climate
Moçâmedes has a hot desert climate (Köppen climate classification BWh). Despite being well north of the Tropic of Capricorn on the Atlantic Coast, the climate is subtropical due to the cooling effect of the northward-flowing Benguela Current causing July and August to be below 18° C.

Economy

During 1966-67 a major iron ore terminal was built at Saco, the bay 12 km North of Moçâmedes, to serve the iron ore mine inland at Cassinga. Construction of the mine installations and a 300 km railway were commissioned to Krupp of Germany and the modern harbour terminal to SETH, a Portuguese company owned by Højgaard & Schultz of Denmark. 

Within one year the first 250,000 ton ore carrier docked and loaded with ore in 1967.

Culture

Religion
The city's Sé Catedral de São Pedro is the cathedral episcopal see of the Roman Catholic Diocese of Namibe, which was established in 2009 on territory split from its Metropolitan's Roman Catholic Archdiocese of Lubango, to which it is a suffragan diocese.

Sports
In 2013, Moçâmedes, then called Namibe, and the national capital Luanda jointly hosted the 2013 FIRS Men's Roller Hockey World Cup, the first time that a World Cup of roller hockey was held in Africa.

Transport

Rail 
Moçâmedes is the terminus of the Moçâmedes Railway. This line was originally 600mm gauge but was converted to 1067mm gauge in the 1950s.

Sea 

It has one of Angola's three major ports, alongside Luanda and Lobito.

Air 
Moçâmedes is served by the Namibe Airport located about 7 km to the south of the city.  The old Yuri Gagarin airport, only about 1.7 km from the city's center, connects the city to the rest of the country.

See also 
 Namibe Province

References

Bibliography 
 Clarence-Smith, W. G. Slaves, Peasants and Capitalists in Southern Angola 1840-1926. New York: Cambridge UP, 1979.
 Clarence-Smith, W. G. "Slavery in Coastal Southern Angola, 1875-1913." Journal of Southern African Studies 2.2 (1976), 214-23.

External links 
 The Catholic diocese, with episcopal incumbent biographies at GigaCatholic

Populated coastal places in Angola
Ports and harbours in Africa
Municipalities of Angola
Namibe Province
Provincial capitals in Angola
Populated places established in 1840
1840 establishments in the Portuguese Empire